Vaigalnathar Temple is a Hindu temple in the village of Thiruvaigal in the Mayiladuthurai district of Tamil Nadu, India. The temple is dedicated to Shiva.

History 
The Vaigalnathar Temple is believed to be one of the three major temples constructed by the Early Chola king Kocengannan. Praises of the temple are found in the Thevaram as well as Thiruvasakam. The presiding deity is Shiva in form of Shenbaga Aranyeswarar.

Shrines 
The temple complex has shrines to Brahma, Vishnu, Lakshmi and Agastya.

References 
 

Shiva temples in Mayiladuthurai district
Padal Petra Stalam
Maadakkoil